QSM is an acronym that may stand for:

 QuickSilver Scalable Multicast, a networking protocol
 Queen's Service Medal, a medal awarded by the government of New Zealand
 Quadriceps Sparing Myopathy, a common name for the hereditary inclusion body myopathy IBM2
 Quantitative susceptibility mapping, a medical imaging technique